Eduardo Casar González (Mexico City, 6 March 1952) is a Mexican writer and professor of literature.

Life and work
He has a doctorate on Hispanic Language and Literature by Language and Literature Faculty on UNAM with the work: "Paul Ricoeur and others´ utility on literary critics and creation". Nowadays he is a full-time professor in the University. At the same time teaches Literary composition on Mexican Writers General Society  SOGEM,  Writers´ School on  Coyoacán.

He conducts since 1994 Voces interiores, a radio program from UNAM  Cultural Vinculation General Direction and Radio Educación. Also, is a conductor on TV cultural show La dichosa palabra on Conaculta Canal 22.

He was laureated with different prices, like the Literary Essay Award José Revueltas and The International Award Bicentenary Letters "Sor Juana Inés de la Cruz".

References

1952 births
Living people
Academic staff of the National Autonomous University of Mexico